Dos Fraye Vort ("The Free Word"; , also Dos Freie Vort) was a short-lived Jewish anarchist newspaper from Liverpool in 1898 edited by Rudolf Rocker.

In 1898, Morris Jeger, a Jewish anarchist from Liverpool and owner of a small printing shop, persuaded Rudolf Rocker and his common-law wife Milly Witkop to move to the city after Rocker was unable to find employment in London. Once there, Jeger also convinced the German-born anarchist to edit the Yiddish newspaper Dos Fraye Vort. Rocker objected that he neither spoke the language, nor knew much about the Jewish anarchist movement in England, although he had spent some time with Jewish anarchists in Whitechapel, London. Jeger offered to translate Rocker's articles from German. Dos Fraye Vort consisted of no more than four pages and had a circulation of just a few hundred copies. It was first published in late July 1898 becoming England's sole Yiddish anarchist periodical, as London's Arbeter Fraynd had stopped appearing for lack of funds. The paper was received well by the British Jewish anarchists, but Rocker was not happy with it, in part because Jeger smuggled in many of his own thoughts while translating Rocker's writings. After just four or five editions of Dos Fraye Vort had been published, Rocker received an invitation from Thomas Eyges, the secretary of the Arbeter Fraynd committee, who was impressed by the job Rocker did with the Liverpool paper, to return to London and become the editor of the revived Arbeter Fraynd. Rocker could not reject the offer. Thus the last edition of Dos Fraye Vort, its eighth, was published on 17 September 1898.

References 
 pg. 239.
 pp. 193–194.

1898 establishments in the United Kingdom
1898 disestablishments in the United Kingdom
Anarchist periodicals published in the United Kingdom
Defunct political magazines published in the United Kingdom
Jewish anarchism
Jewish English history
Jewish magazines
Magazines established in 1898
Magazines disestablished in 1898
Yiddish anarchist periodicals
Yiddish culture in England
Mass media in Liverpool
Secular Jewish culture in the United Kingdom